A COROP region is a division of the Netherlands for statistical purposes, used by Statistics Netherlands, among others. These divisions are also used in the EU designation as NUTS 3.

List of municipalities by COROP region

Northern Netherlands

Groningen province

Friesland province

Drenthe province

Eastern Netherlands

Overijssel province

Gelderland province

Flevoland province

Western Netherlands

Utrecht province

North Holland province

South Holland province

Zeeland province

Southern Netherlands

North Brabant province

Limburg province

See also
 Indeling van Nederland in 40 COROP-gebieden per 01-01-2017 (kaart), website CBS
 COROP-indeling per 01-01-2012 (kaart), website CBS
 COROP-indeling per 01-01-2012 (tekst), website CBS

Subdivisions of the Netherlands
Netherlands